Thanbula (Trilokavatamsika, U Sauk Pan, or Sambhula, also spelled Thambula) was a chief queen consort of King Kyansittha of the Pagan Dynasty of Burma (Myanmar). She met Kyansittha while he was in exile at Kyaungbyu, and later gave birth to Yazakumar. Kyansittha went back to Bagan (Pagan), and later became king. She found out about it only years later, and showed up at the palace gate with their son. By then Kyansittha, thinking he did not have a male heir, had already anointed his grandson Alaungsithu the heir apparent. Kyansittha made her his chief queen with the title Usaukpan and Yazakumar the titular lord of North Arakan and Seven Hill Tracts.

References

Bibliography
 
 

Chief queens consort of Pagan
Queens consort of Pagan
11th-century Burmese women
12th-century Burmese women